Deming (DEM-ing) is a city in Luna County, New Mexico, United States,  west of Las Cruces and  north of the Mexican border. The population was 14,855 as of the 2010 census. Deming is the county seat and principal community of Luna County.

History
The city is within the Gadsden Purchase of 1853, which was acquired from Mexico specifically to provide a southern route for a railroad to connect the United States with California. Deming was founded in 1881 and incorporated in 1902, and is named after Mary Ann Deming Crocker, wife of Charles Crocker, one of the Big Four of the California railroad industry. The Silver Spike was driven here on March 8, 1881, to commemorate the meeting of the Southern Pacific with the Rio Grande, Mexico and Pacific (a subsidiary of the Atchison, Topeka & Santa Fe) railroads. This was the second transcontinental railroad to be completed in North America.

Deming became an important port of entry near the US-Mexican border. A nickname was given to the city at the time of its founding, "New Chicago". It was expected that with the surge of railroad usage, that the city would grow drastically and resemble Chicago, Illinois.

There are numerous ancient Native American sites around Deming. The Mimbres and Casas Grandes cultures made pottery of remarkable quality, and the Deming area is rich in native pottery artifacts, as well as beads, stone implements, stone carvings, graves, etc. The artifacts are now on display at multiple museums.

Government

The city of Deming is governed by four elected council members and a mayor. The mayor is elected by popular vote rather than by the council. All officers serve four-year terms.

The mayor of Deming, since March 10, 2014, is Benny Jasso.

The city council consists of the following representatives from four districts:

 District 1 - Monica Topham
 District 2 - Irma Rodriquez
 District 3 - Joe Milo
 District 4 - Alex Valdespino

Geography
Deming is north of the center of Luna County at  (32.261137, −107.755857), in the Basin and Range Province of North America. Interstate 10 runs through the north side of the city, leading east  to Las Cruces and west the same distance to Lordsburg. U.S. Route 180 leads northwest from Deming  to Silver City, while State Road 26 leads northeast  to Hatch. State Road 11 leads south  to Columbus and an additional  to the Mexico–United States border at Puerto Palomas.

The city is surrounded by land that appears flat, with wide rubble aprons around the nearby mountains and imperceptible grades in various directions.

The Mimbres River floods the Deming area once a decade or so, in periods of unusually heavy rainfall in the Cookes Range and Black Range to the north.

Deming and its surrounding area is underlain by an aquifer of good-quality water. The aquifer is slowly recharged primarily by water from the mountains to the north. The water usually has a high sulfur content.

In the late 1960s, Select Western Lands Inc. ran full-page advertisements for land in Deming in The Saturday Evening Post. The ads proclaimed "Your Own Ranchette Only $299, Only $5 a Month", for a half-acre. Only $15 a month."

Climate

Deming is located within the Upper Chihuahuan Desert climate zone. The climate is dry, hot, and breezy. Summer temperatures often exceed , but the altitude and dry air sometimes make summer days more comfortable than one would expect given the high temperature.

Most precipitation occurs as thunderstorms and showers during the July–September monsoon period. Minor flooding sometimes occurs over large areas of flat ground. There are periods lasting from five to twenty years of relatively wet or dry years. Springtime is often windy, and dust storms can be severe, occasionally lasting for days. Snow is likely to fall in winter, but usually melts in a day or two. Temperatures in winter are sometimes below freezing at night, but winter days are generally mild and sunny.

Demographics

As of the census of 2000, there were 14,116 people, 5,267 households, and 3,628 families residing in the city. The population density was 1,512.0 people per square mile (583.5/km). There were 6,192 housing units at an average density of 663.2 per square mile (256.0/km). The racial makeup of the city was 69.66% White, 1.37% Native American, 1.23% African American, 0.48% Asian, 0.01% Pacific Islander, 24.19% from other races, and 3.07% from two or more races. 64.58% of the population were Hispanic or Latino of any race. There were 5,267 households, out of which 34.9% had children under the age of 18 living with them, 49.0% were married couples living together, 15.5% had a female householder with no husband present, and 31.1% were non-families. 27.8% of all households were made up of individuals, and 15.7% had someone living alone who was 65 years of age or older. The average household size was 2.63 and the average family size was 3.23.

In the city, the population was: 30.9% under the age of 18, 8.2% from 18 to 24, 23.1% from 25 to 44, 19.3% from 45 to 64, and 18.6% who were 65 years of age or older. The median age was 35 years. For every 100 females, there were 89.7 males. For every 100 females age 18 and over, there were 85.9 males.

The median income for a household in the city was $20,081, and the median income for a family was $23,030. Males had a median income of $25,379 versus $16,462 for females. The per capita income for the city was $10,943. About 28.5% of families and 32.9% of the population were below the poverty line, including 47.4% of those under age 18 and 16.6% of those age 65 or over.

Economy
Deming's economy is based on transportation, real estate, agriculture, energy, retirement, tourism, and the United States Department of Homeland Security. United States Border Patrol vehicles comprise a large fraction of Deming area road traffic.

Deming also sits astride one of the major railroad lines linking the East Coast with the West Coast, via the Southern Route.

In 2006, the city's role in American homeland security expanded. Deming's industrial park became the home of a Border Patrol training center, a  forward operating base named Border Wolf that supported Operation Jump Start. These temporary buildings at the airport have since been disassembled and removed.

In popular culture

Literature
In Cormac McCarthy's second Border Trilogy novel, The Crossing, Billy Parham heads for Deming after returning to the U.S. from his second trip to Mexico

Movies and television

Since 1953, several motion pictures have been filmed in Deming:

Indiana Jones and the Kingdom of the Crystal Skull 
Gas Food Lodging
The Themyscira scenes in Batman v Superman: Dawn of Justice
The French-American movie Two Men in Town (2014 film) (a remake of the 1973 French film, Deux Hommes Dans La Ville starring Alain Delon) was filmed in Deming and other locations in Luna County
Creed II: Rocky Balboa and Donnie Creed (Sylvester Stallone and Michael B. Jordan) hold their training camp in the desert of Deming, NM.

Transportation
Airports
 Deming Municipal Airport, formerly Deming Army Air Field, is now private and charter.

Major highways

Railroads
 Freight service is provided by Union Pacific and the Southwestern Railroad.
 Amtrak's Sunset Limited and Texas Eagle routes stop at Deming Train Station.

Attractions

The Deming Luna Mimbres museum, housed in the historic Deming Armory (1916) and Customs House, features an important collection of Mimbres Indian painted pottery, historic period-furnished rooms in the Seaman Fields House, an antique auto collection, a restored Harvey House restaurant, a doll collection, and a geological section.

Nearby are City of Rocks State Park, with volcanic rock formations, and Rockhound State Park, offering mineral and rock collecting.

The Great American Duck Race is held every year on the third weekend of August. It features wet and dry duck race tracks, a hot air balloon show, a Tournament of Ducks Parade, a carnival, and a variety of vendors setting up their wares in the Courthouse Square and surrounding property.

Deming has two wineries. St. Clair Winery is New Mexico's largest winery. The Luna Rossa Winery is a local estate winery that produces all of its wines with varieties grown on their own vineyards.

Education
Residents attend schools in the Deming Public Schools.

Notable people
 Wade Blasingame, MLB pitcher
 Nacio Herb Brown, songwriter
 Craig Noel, founding director of the Old Globe Theatre in San Diego, California
 Sarah Bedichek Pipkin, geneticist
 Frank Ray, country music singer
 Max Crook, the musician and songwriter who co-wrote Del Shannon's hit song "Runaway"

Police controversy
On January 2, 2013, Deming officers Bobby Orosco and Robert Chavez pulled over David W. Eckert for a rolling stop. Based on claim of "clenched buttocks", police obtained a search warrant and executed multiple cavity searches, surgeries and several other medical procedures on the driver. No drugs were found, and the driver was sent a bill for the procedures performed by Gila Regional Medical Center in Silver City. In January 2014, the lawsuit with Luna County and the city of Deming was settled for a total of $1.6 million.

Footnotes

External links

 
 Deming–Luna County Chamber of Commerce

Cities in New Mexico
Cities in Luna County, New Mexico
County seats in New Mexico
Micropolitan areas of New Mexico
1881 establishments in New Mexico Territory
Populated places established in 1881